Canchacanchajasa (possibly from Quechua kancha enclosure, enclosed place, yard, a frame, or wall that encloses, q'asa mountain pass, the reduplication indicates that there is a group or a complex of something, "Cancha Cancha mountain pass") is a  mountain in the Urubamba mountain range in the Andes of Peru. It is located in the Cusco Region, Calca Province, Calca District, north of the Urubamba River. Canchacanchajasa is situated southeast of Sirihuani, north of Cóndorhuachana and Huamanchoque and southwest of  Sahuasiray. It lies in the upper part of the Cancha Cancha valley (kancha kancha) at the Lares trek.

See also 
 Pucaorjo

References

Mountains of Peru
Mountains of Cusco Region